The Boy Who Cried Bitch is a 1991 American independent drama film directed by Juan Jose Campanella and starring Harley Cross, Karen Young, Jason Biggs (in his first speaking role), Jesse Bradford and Adrien Brody. It was Campanella's feature film debut. It was based on real events.

Plot 
The story focuses on Dan Love (Harley Cross), a young boy with misdiagnosed (or undiagnosed) mental condition(s), who slowly plunges the life of his mother, Candice (Karen Young), into an unbridled chaos.

Cast 
 Harley Cross as Dan Love
 Karen Young as Candice Love
 Jesse Bradford as Mike Love
 J.D. Daniels as Nick Love
 Adrien Brody as Eddie
 Jason Biggs as Robert
 Moira Kelly as Jessica
 Gene Canfield as Jim Cutler
 Dennis Boutsikaris as Orin Fell
 Reathel Bean as Dr. Goldstein
 Edwina Lewis as Ann Marie, R.N.
 Ru Flynn as Ruth Nussbaum
 Kario Salem as Dr. Habib
 John Rothman as Stokes
 Samurel Wright as Richard
 Perry Moore as William
 Sean Ashby as Gene
 Chris McKenna as Ross
 Michael Miceli as Chet
 Judd Trichter as Jay
 Bruce McCarty as Gary
 Sally Kaye Kaufman as Fern
 Leslie Shenkel as Eddie's Father

Production 
Much of the filming was done at the McGovern residence in Bronxville.

Campanella said that the script was mostly based on the real life of screenwriter Catherine May Levin.

Release and sequel 
Originally exhibited at the Boston Film Festival in 1991, the film contained an alternate ending. It was never given to the MPAA for examination, and thus remains unrated.

It was followed by a semi-sequel called The Boy Who Cried Bitch: The Adolescent Years (2007), without the participation of many of the crew members of the original film, with the exception of scriptwriter Catherine May Levin.

References

External links 
 
 
 

1991 films
1991 drama films
American independent films
American drama films
Films directed by Juan José Campanella
1991 independent films
1990s English-language films
1990s American films